The Norway national women's cricket team is the team that represents Norway in international women's cricket. In April 2018, the International Cricket Council (ICC) granted full Women's Twenty20 International (WT20I) status to all its members. Therefore, all Twenty20 matches played between Norway women and other ICC members after 1 July 2018 are full WT20I matches.

The team played its first WT20I matches in the 2019 France Women's T20I Quadrangular Series, during July and August 2019, in Nantes.

Records and statistics
International Match Summary — Norway Women
 
Last updated 14 November 2022

Twenty20 International

 Highest team total: 120/9 v Austria on 31 July 2019 at Parc du Grand Blottereau, Nantes.
 Highest individual score: 41*, Mutaiba Ansar v Austria on 31 July 2019 at Parc du Grand Blottereau, Nantes.
 Best individual bowling figures: 3/9, Farial Zia Safdar v Sweden on 29 August 2021 at Guttsta Wicked Cricket Ground, Kolsva.

T20I record versus other nations

Records complete to WT20I #1299. Last updated 14 November 2022.

See also
 List of Norway women Twenty20 International cricketers

References

Women's
Women's national cricket teams
Cricket